Igor Yuryevich Nikolayev (born 17 January 1960) is a Russian composer, singer and song-writer.

Biography
Nikolayev was born in Kholmsk, Sakhalin Oblast, into the family of Sakhalin-marinist poet Yury Nikolayev. He graduated from pop Branch (class composer Igor Yakushenko) of the Moscow Institute of Culture. In the early 1980s he worked in the ensemble "Recital" of Alla Pugacheva on keyboard and as an arranger. In 1983 Alla Pugacheva and Nikolayev recorded songs "Iceberg", "Tell, birds!", which made Nikolayev famous author. He has a daughter Yulia Igorevna Nikolaeva from his first marriage. There was a second marriage with singer Natasha Koroleva. He has a daughter Veronika Igorevna Nikolaeva from his second marriage with singer Yulia Proskuryakova, who in 2021 started a scandal with insults to people who occupied her parking space for cars.

Solo career
His solo career as a singer began in 1986, his debut in that capacity was the song "Mill". Recipient of national music awards "Ovation 1995" in the category "composer".

Igor Nikolaev – holds the prestigious music awards: "Ovation-92" – for the album "Dolphin and mermaid", "Ovation-95" – in the nomination composer year, "Ovation-97" – in the nomination poet year, "Ovation-99" – in the nomination composer year, "Song-99" – for his outstanding contribution to the development of songs (aide Prize Isaak Dunayevsky), "Golden Gramophone Award-2001" – for the song "Five Reasons", "Best composer in 2002" – prize of the festival "Pesnya Goda".

In 2004 he became a composer at Star Factory 4.

Popular Songs
 Iceberg (Айсберг) by Alla Pugacheva
 Ozero nadezhdy (Озеро надежды, Hope lake) by Alla Pugacheva 
 Ne obijay menya (Не обижай меня) by Alla Pugacheva 
 Paromshik (Паромщик) by Alla Pugacheva
 Parahody (Пароходы) by Valery Leontiev 
 Tri minuty (Три минуты, Three minutes) by Valery Leontiev 
 Komarovo (Комарово) by Igor Sklyar
 Strannik Moy (Cтранник мой) by Irina Allegrova 
 Zheltye Tulpani (Жёлтые тюльпаны) by Natasha Koroleva
 Malenkaya strana (Маленькая страна, Little country) by Natasha Koroleva
 Kievskiy mal’chishka (Киевский мальчишка, Kiev boy) by Natasha Koroleva
 Ya Ne Rafael (Я не Рафаэль, I am not Rafael) by Philipp Kirkorov
 Nemnogo zhal (Немного жаль) by Philipp Kirkorov
 Vip'em Za Lyubov (Выпьем За Любовь, Let’s drink for love) 
 Dve Zvezdy (Две звезды, Two stars) by Alla Pugacheva and Vladimir Kuzmin
 Staraya Melnica (Старая мельница)
 Taxi Taxi (Такси, Такси)
 Den Rojdeniya (День Рождения, Birthday)
 Master and Margarita (Мастер и Маргарита)
 Volshebnoye steklo moyey dushi ( Волшебное стекло моей души, The magic of my soul glass) by Diana Gurtskaya
 Piano in the night (Рояль в ночи)
 Kingdom of Crooked Mirrors (Королевство кривых зеркал)
 You do not know how beautiful you are ( Ты даже не знаешь, как ты прекрасна)

Discography
1986 — Счастья в личной жизни, Alla Pugacheva (Good Luck in the Personal Life!)
1987 — Мельница (Mill)
1989 — Королевство кривых зеркал (Kingdom Of Crooked Mirrors)
1989 — Фантастика (Fantasy)
1989 — Kingdom of Carnival Mirrors, Sweden
1989 — Aqarius 1999 (Lisa Nilsson), Sweden
1989 — Julen Ar Har (Tommy Korberg), Sweden
1990 — Жёлтые тюльпаны Natalya Koroleva (Yellow Tulips)
1991 — Мисс разлука (Ms. Separation)
1992 — Дельфин и русалка (The Dolphin and the Mermaid)
1992 — Странник мой Irina Allegrova (My Stranger)
1994 — Малиновое вино (Raspberry Wine)
1994 — Поклонник Natalya Koroleva ("Admirer")
1995 — Конфетти Natalya вKoroleva ("Confetti")
1995 — Выпьем за любовь (Let's Toast to Love)
1997 — Пятнадцать лет. Лучшие песни (15 Years. The Best Songs)
1997 — Бриллианты слёз Natalya Koroleva (Diamonds Of Tears)
1998 — Игорь Николаев-98 (Igor Nikolaev-98)
2000 — Разбитая чашка любви (The Broken Cup Of Love)
2001 — Самая родная (The Dearest)
2001 — Дочка …и я (feat. Yulia Nikolaeva) (The Daughter ...And I)
2002 — Прости и отпусти (Forgive And Let Go)
2004 — ЗДРАВСТВУЙ (HELLO)
2004 — Миллион красивых женщин (compilation) (Million Of Beautiful Women)
2006 — Как ты прекрасна ( How Beautiful You are )
 2006 —  Просто всё прошло (Everything has ended)
 2006 — Лучшие песни. Новая коллекция (Best songs. New collection)
 2010 — Игорь Николаев и Юлия Проскурякова: Новые песни (Igor Nikolaev and Yulia Proskuryakova: New Songs)
 2010 —   Англоязычные песни Игоря Николаева   (Igor Nikolaev's English-language songs)
  2014 —   Линия жизни  (Lifeline)

References

External links
Igor Nikolayev Biography

1960 births
Living people
People from Sakhalin Oblast
Soviet composers
Soviet male composers
Russian composers
Russian male composers
Soviet poets
Soviet male writers
20th-century Russian male writers
20th-century Russian singers
21st-century Russian singers
Russian male poets
Russian record producers
Russian songwriters
20th-century Russian male singers
21st-century Russian male singers
Winners of the Golden Gramophone Award